Battle Lines may refer to:

 "Battle Lines" (Star Trek: Deep Space Nine), first-season episode of Star Trek: Deep Space Nine
 Voice Mail, a 1995 album by John Wetton re-released internationally as Battle Lines
 Battle Lines (Bob Moses album), 2018

See also
 Battlelines, a 2009 book by Tony Abbott
 Battleline Publications
 Line of battle